The following highways are numbered 985:

United States
  Interstate 985
  Florida State Road 985
  Iowa Highway 985 (former)
  Louisiana Highway 985
  Maryland Route 985
 Maryland Route 985A
  Pennsylvania Route 985
  Farm to Market Road 985

Territories
  Puerto Rico Highway 985